Jose Ruado Riano (born July 28, 1967) is a Filipino politician from the Province of Romblon in the Philippines. He currently serves as the Governor of Romblon since 2019. He previously served as the province's vice governor from 2013 to 2019.

Political Career 
Jose Riano served as Vice Governor of the Province of Romblon for two terms from 2013 until 2019, under Governor Eduardo Firmalo. He is the Only Unopposed Vice Governor in 2016 election and the 1st Vice Governor to be elected as Governor. He was also appointed by Former President Rodrigo Duterte as the chairman of Regional Development Council- MIMAROPA (October 2019). He was re-elected in 2022 election and won over his rival, former Governor Eduardo Firmalo.

References 

https://palawan-news.com/mga-bagong-ambulansya-ng-romblon-dumating-na/
https://www.pna.gov.ph/articles/1177202
https://legacy.senate.gov.ph/press_release/2021/1102_go1.asp
https://romblonnews.net/2022/06/mga-ospital-sa-romblon-tutukan-parin-ni-gov-riano-sa-kanyang-ikalawang-termino/
https://manilastandard.net/news/national/368982/romblon-governor-hails-malasakit-center-initiative.html
https://romblonnews.net/2019/10/duterte-appoints-governor-riano-as-new-mimaropa-rdc-chair/
https://romblonnews.net/2020/11/bagong-sea-ambulance-kaloob-ng-prov-l-gov-t-sa-simara-island/

External links

Province of Romblon 

Living people
Governors of Romblon
1977 births
PDP–Laban politicians